Fatal Love is the seventh and the third Korean-language studio album by the South Korean boy group Monsta X. It was released by Starship Entertainment and distributed by Kakao M on November 2, 2020.

Background and release 
The album was announced on October 5, 2020. The title track for the album is "Love Killa". The group collaborated with labelmates Brother Su and Jooyoung, as well as singer Eric Nam and DJ Justin Oh, for the production of the album. Additionally, the album includes Hyungwon's first song, which he is credited in all aspects of the production, including writing, composing, and arranging, for the song "Nobody Else".

The physical album was released in four versions.

Critical reception
According to Faith Jung of SCMP, the album can be summed up in two words: "power" and "charisma", adding that it is a record "packed with bops perfect for dancing". This album proves that they can "come back harder and better with each new release", and each song exemplifies their "distinct style", while complementing the album's "deadly concept".

The album received praise for "showcasing all facets of their songwriting and each members' distinct artistry". The song "Nobody Else" gained praise, for its showcasing of group member Hyungwon's musical range in composition, and the album overall was praised for its "diverse musicality to satisfy any palette".

Listicles

Commercial performance	
Fatal Love became Monsta X's third certified platinum album through the Gaon Music Chart and sold over 280,000 albums as of January 2021. 

"Love Killa" debuted on the weekly Billboard World Digital Song Sales chart at number fourteen upon release, while "Nobody Else" and "Night View" placed at number ten and at number thirteen, respectively in 2021. "Love Killa" peaked at number 135 on the weekly Gaon Digital Chart, while the other tracks did not appear on the main chart but still debuted on its component chart, the Gaon Download Chart, with "Sorry I'm Not Sorry" debuting at 170, "Beastmode" at 173, "Gasoline" at 176, "Thriller" at 180, "Night View" at 181, "Nobody Else" at 188, "Stand Together" at 189, "Last Carnival" at 191, and "Guess Who" at 199. It won two music show awards on The Show and Show Champion.

Track listing

Charts

Album

Weekly charts

Monthly chart

Year-end chart

Songs

Weekly charts

Certification and sales

Accolades

Awards and nominations

Release history

See also
 List of K-pop songs on the Billboard charts
 List of K-pop albums on the Billboard charts
 List of K-pop songs on the World Digital Song Sales chart
 List of Gaon Album Chart number ones of 2020

Notes

References 

2020 albums
Korean-language albums
Monsta X albums
Starship Entertainment albums